Hal Niedzviecki (born January 9, 1971) is a Canadian novelist and cultural critic. Born in Brockville, he was raised by a Jewish family in Ottawa, Ontario, and Potomac, Maryland, did his undergraduate studies at University College, Toronto, and his postgraduate studies at Bard College. In 1995, he co-founded the magazine Broken Pencil, a guide to underground arts and zine culture, and was the magazine's editor until 2002. He has also written for Adbusters, Utne, The Walrus, This Magazine, Geist, Toronto Life, The Globe and Mail, and the National Post. In 2006, Niedzviecki hosted a summer replacement series, Subcultures, on CBC Radio One.

In 2017, Niedzviecki wrote a piece for Write, the Writers' Union of Canada magazine, where he wrote: "In my opinion, anyone, anywhere, should be encouraged to imagine other peoples, other cultures, other identities" and told writers to try to "Win the Appropriation Prize". After controversy arose over the piece he resigned from the editorial board.

Work
 Concrete Forest: The New Fiction of Urban Canada (1998, anthology)
 Smell It (1998, short fiction)
 Lurvy, A Farmer's Almanac (1999, novel)
 We Want Some Too: Underground Desire and the Reinvention of Mass Culture (2000)
 Ditch (2001, novel)
 The Original Canadian City Dweller's Almanac (2002, with Darren Wershler-Henry)
 Hello, I'm Special: How Individuality Became the New Conformity (2004)
 The Program (2005, novel)
 The Big Book of Pop Culture: A How-to Guide for Young Artists (2006)
 The Peep Diaries: How We're Learning to Love Watching Ourselves and Our Neighbors (City Lights, 2009) .
 Look Down, This Is Where It Must Have Happened (City Lights, 2011) 
 Trees on Mars: Our Obsession with the Future, (Seven Stories Press, 2015)

References

External links
 
 Interview with Hal Niedzviecki, online from CBC Words at Large
 Editor quits amid outrage after call for 'Appropriation Prize' in writers' magazine article from the Toronto Star

1971 births
21st-century Canadian non-fiction writers
21st-century Canadian novelists
Bard College alumni
Canadian male novelists
Living people
People from Brockville
People from Potomac, Maryland
University of Toronto alumni
Writers from Maryland
Writers from Ontario
Canadian male non-fiction writers